Brian Joseph  Rigney (born 22 September 1963 in Portlaoise) is an Irish former rugby union player who won 8 caps for his country between 1991 and 1992. He had to retire because of injury.

He played club rugby for Greystones RFC. He played for Leinster between 1988 and 1996. He is now a food and beverages industry professional. His nickname is Riggers. His brother Colm played professional rugby for Connacht.

References

1963 births
Living people
Greystones RFC players
Irish rugby union players
Ireland international rugby union players
Rugby union players from Portlaoise
Rugby union locks